Leugny may refer to the following places in France:

 Leugny, Vienne, a commune in the Vienne department
 Leugny, Yonne, a commune in the Yonne department